The Reference and User Services Association (RUSA) annual Outstanding Reference Sources awards are considered the highest awards honoring academic reference books or media,. Besides these awards, the American Library Association (ALA) also grants other medals and honors including the Andrew Carnegie Medals for Excellence in Fiction and Nonfiction and the Dartmouth Medal for the "creation of a reference work of outstanding quality and significance." In addition, the ALA List of Notable Books for Adults, selected by the RUSA Notable Books Council, has been chosen yearly since 1944.

Nomination and awards decisions are made by the ALA's Reference and User Services Association (RUSA), the "authority in top reference works in print or on World Wide Web." Awards are selected by RUSA's Collection Development and Evaluation Section (CODES) Reference Sources Committee.

An annotated list of their selection of outstanding reference works is published annually in the May issue of American Libraries.

Recent RUSA Book and Media Awards

2017 Awards
 “The 21st-Century Voter: Who Votes, How They Vote, and Why They Vote.” Guido H. Stempel III and Thomas K. Hargrove, editors. ABC-CLIO.
 “Gun Politics in America: Historical and Modern Documents in Context.” Harry L. Wilson. ABC-CLIO.
 “Youth Cultures in America.” Simon J. Bronner and Cindy Dell Clark, editors. Greenwood.
 “Miracles: An Encyclopedia of People, Places, and Supernatural Events from Antiquity to the Present.” Patrick J. Hayes, editor. ABC-CLIO.
 “American Governance.” Stephen Schechter, Thomas S. Vontz, Thomas A. Birkland, Mark A. Graber, John J. Patrick, editors. Macmillan Reference USA.
 “Encyclopedia of Nordic Crime Fiction: Works and Authors of Denmark, Finland, Iceland, Norway and Sweden Since 1967.” Mitzi M. Brunsdale. McFarland & Company, Inc.
 “Clothing and Fashion: American Fashion from Head to Toe.” Jose Blanco F., Mary D. Doering, Patricia Hunt-Hurst, and Heather Vaughan Lee, editors. ABC-CLIO.
 “The Chicago Guide to Grammar, Usage, and Punctuation.” Bryan A. Garner. The University of Chicago Press.
 “Historical Dictionary of British Spy Fiction.” Alan Burton. Rowman & Littlefield.
 “Dictionary of Caribbean and Afro-Latin American Biography.” Franklin W. Knight and Henry Louis Gates Jr., editors. Oxford University Press.
 “Africa: An Encyclopedia of Culture and Society.” Toyin Falola and Daniel Jean-Jacques, editors. ABC-CLIO.

2016 Awards
Black Stereotypes in Popular Series Fiction, 1851-1955: Jim Crow Era Authors and Their Characters by Bernard A. Drew. McFarland & Company, Inc.
Civil War Biographies from the Western Waters: 956 Confederate and Union Naval and Military Personnel, Contractors, Politicians, Officials,
Steamboat Pilots and Others by Myron J. Smith Jr. McFarland & Company, Inc.
The Encyclopedia of Victorian Literature Dino Franco Felluga, editor. Wiley Blackwell.
Modern Genocide: The Definitive Resource and Document Collection by Paul R. Bartrop and Steven Leonard Jacobs, editors. ABC-CLIO.
The Oxford Illustrated Shakespeare Dictionary by David and Ben Crystal. Oxford University Press.
The Peterson Reference Guide to Owls of North America and the Caribbean by Scott Weidensaul. Houghton Mifflin Harcourt.
The SAGE Encyclopedia of Alcohol: Social, Cultural, and Historical Perspectives Scott C. Martin, editor. SAGE.
Weird Sports and Wacky Games Around the World: From Buzkashi to Zorbin by Victoria Williams. ABC-CLIO.
Women’s Rights in the United States: A Comprehensive Encyclopedia of Issues, Events, and People Tiffany K. Wayne, editor. ABC-CLIO.
Worldmark Global Business and Economy Issues Thomas Riggs, editor. Gale.

2015 Awards
American Indians at Risk, Jeffrey Ian Ross, editor. Greenwood
Black Stats: African Americans by the Numbers in the Twenty-First Century, by Monique W. Morris. The New Press.
Bumblebees of North America, by Paul Williams, Robin Thorp, Leif Richardson & Shelia Colla. Princeton University Press.
Consumer Healthcare, Brigham Narins, editor. Gale Cengage Learning.
Dictionary of Untranslatables: A Philosophical Lexicon. Barbara Cassin, editor. Translation edited by Emily Apter, Jaques Lezra, and Michael Wood. Princeton University Press
The Encyclopedia of Criminology and Criminal Justice. Jay S. Albanese, editor. Wiley Blackwell.
The Encyclopedia of Deception. Timothy R. Levine, editor. SAGE Publishing.
The Encyclopedia of Humor Studies. Salvatore Attardo, editor. SAGE Publishing.
The Encyclopedia of the Wars of The Early American Republic, 1783-1812. Spencer C Tucker, editor. ABC-CLIO.
Muhammad in History, Thought, and Culture: An Encyclopedia of the Prophet of God. Coeli Fitzpatrick and Adam Hani Walker, editors. ABC-CLIO.

2014 Awards
American Civil War: Definitive Encyclopedia and Document collection. Spencer C Tucker, Editor; ABC-CLIO
Literature of Propaganda, Thomas Riggs, editor. St. James Press/Gale Cengage  
Music in American Life: An Encyclopedia of Songs, Styles, Stars, and Stories That Shaped Our Culture. Jacqueline Edmondson, Editor. Greenwood.
Encyclopedia of U.S. Presidency: A Historical Reference. Nancy Beck Young, editor. Facts on File
History of Jewish-Muslim Relations from Origins to Present Day. Abdelwahab Meddeb and Benjamin Stora, editors. Princeton University Press
Frogs of United States and Canada, C. Kenneth Dodd Jr. author. Johns Hopkins University Press.
Encyclopedia of Mind, Harold Pashler, editor. SAGE Reference.
Almanac of American Military History. Spencer C Tucker, editor. ABC-CLIO.
Encyclopedia of Caribbean Religions. Patrick Taylor and Frederick I. Case, editors. University of Illinois Press.
 Special acknowledgement to ProQuest,  for continuing publication of Statistical Abstracts of the United States

2013 Awards
Biotechnology: In Context, edited by Brenda Wilmoth Lerner & K. Lee Lerner, Gale Cengage
Dictionary of African Biography, edited by Emmanuel K. Akyeampong and Henry Louis Gates Jr., Oxford University Press
Encyclopedia of Housing, Second Edition, edited by Andrew T. Carswell, SAGE Publications
Encyclopedia of Peace Psychology, edited by Daniel J. Christie, Wiley-Blackwell
Encyclopedia of Trauma: An Interdisciplinary Guide, edited by Charles R. Figley, SAGE Publications
Enslaved Women In America: An Encyclopedia, edited by Daina Ramey Berry and Deleso A. Alford, Greenwood
Japanese Philosophy: A Source Book, edited by James W. Heisig, et al., University of Hawaii Press
Literature of War, edited by Thomas Riggs, St. James Press/Gale Cengage
Presidents and Black America: A Documentary History, by Stephen A. Jones and Eric Freedman, Sage/CQ Press
Typography Referenced: A Comprehensive Visual Guide to Language, History, and Practice of Typography, edited by Allan Haley et al., Rockport Publishers
Women in American Politics: History and Milestones, by Doris Weatherford, Sage/CQ Press

2012 Awards
Encyclopedia of Political Science, George T Kurian editor-in-chief. CQ Press, 9781933116440
Civil War Naval Encyclopedia, edited by Spencer Tucker. ABC-CLIO, 9781598843385
Competing Voices from Russian Revolution: Fighting Words, edited by Michael Hickey. Greenwood, 9780313385230
Oxford Encyclopedia of Books of Bible, edited by Michael D. Coogan. Oxford University Press, 9780195377378
Concise Encyclopedia of Amish, Brethren, Hutterites, and Mennonites, by Donald B. Kraybill. Johns Hopkins University Press, 9780801896576
Polish American Encyclopedia, edited by James S. Pula. McFarland & Company, Inc., 9780786433087
Green’s Dictionary of Slang, by Jonathon Green. Oxford University Press, 9780550104403
Encyclopedia of Sports Medicine, edited by Lyle J. Micheli. SAGE Publications, 9781412961158
Encyclopedia of Literary and Cultural Theory, Michael Ryan, general editor. Wiley-Blackwell, 9781405183123
Homer Encyclopedia, edited by Margalit Finkelberg. Wiley-Blackwell,  9781405177689
Grove Encyclopedia of American Art, edited by Joan D. Marter. Oxford University Press, 9780195335798

2011 Awards
Oxford Companion to the Book. Michael F. Suarez, S.J. and H.R. Woudhuysen, eds. 2 vols. Oxford, 2010. 9780198606536
Encyclopedia of Identity. Ronald L. Jackson II, ed. 2 vols. Sage, 2010. 9781412951531
Encyclopedia of Geography. Barney Warf, ed. 6 vols. Sage, 2010. 9781412956970
Oxford Encyclopedia of Ancient Greece and Rome. Michael Gagarin, ed. 7 vols. Oxford, 2010. 9780195170726
Encyclopedia of Religion in America. Charles H. Lippy and Peter W. Williams, eds. 4 vols. CQ Press, 2010. 9780872895805
Off Broadway Musicals, 1910 – 2007: Casts, Credits, Songs, Critical Reception and Performance Data of More Than 1,800 Shows. Dan Dietz, ed. 1 vol. McFarland. 2010. 9780786433995
Encyclopedia of World Dress and Fashion. Joanne B. Eicher, ed. 10 vols. Oxford, 2010. 9780195377330 Berg Fashion Library. Oxford, 2010.
Chronology of Evolution-Creationism Controversy. Randy Moore, ed., et al. 1 vol. Greenwood. 2009. 9780313362873
Oxford International Encyclopedia of Peace. Nigel Young, ed. 4. vols. Oxford. 2010. 9780195334685
21st Century Economics A Reference Handbook. Rhona C. Free, ed. 2 vols. Sage. 2010. 9781412961424
Encyclopedia of Political Theory. Mark Bevir, ed. 3 vols. Sage. 2010. 9781412958653
Encyclopedia of Group Processes & Intergroup Relations. John M. Levine and Michael A. Hogg, eds. 2 vols. Sage. 2010. 9781412942089

2010 Awards
Archaeology in America: An Encyclopedia Greenwood Press, Francis P. McManamon
Encyclopedia of African American History: 1896 to Present Oxford University Press, Paul Finkelman
Encyclopedia of Modern China Charles Scribner’s Sons, David Pong
Encyclopedia of Spanish-American and Philippine-American Wars ABC-CLIO, Spencer Tucker
Encyclopedia of Environmental Ethics and Philosophy Gale Cengage, J. Baird Callicott and Robert Frodeman
Encyclopedia of Human Rights Oxford, David Forsythe
Social Explorer, an online reference resource   location
Broadway Plays and Musicals: Descriptions and Essential Facts McFarland & Company Publishers, Thomas S. Hischak
American Countercultures Sharp, Gina Misiroglu
Encyclopedia of Gender and Society Sage, Jodi O’Brien
Encyclopedia of Marine Science Facts on File, Nichols C. Reid and Robert G. Williams

2009 Awards
Dartmouth Medal: Greenwood Publishing, Pop Culture Universe. Honorable mention: Gershon David Hundert, YIVO Encyclopedia of Jews in Eastern Europe.

Books and Beyond: Greenwood Encyclopedia of New American Reading. Kenneth Womack, ed. 4 vols. Greenwood, 2008. 9780313337383. 
Encyclopedia of Taoism. Fabrizio Pregadio, ed. 2 vols. Routledge, 2008. 9780700712007.
Encyclopedia of First Amendment. John R. Vile, David L. Hudson Jr. and David Schultz, eds. 2 vols. CQ Press, 2009. 9780872893115.
Greenwood Encyclopedia of Folktales and Fairy Tales. Donald Haase, ed. 3 vols. Greenwood, 2008. 9780313334412.
Encyclopedia of Education Law. Charles J. Russo, ed. 2 vols. Sage, 2008. 9781412940795.
Climate Change: In Context. Brenda Wilmoth Lerner and K. Lee Lerner, eds. 2 vols. Gale Cengage, 2008. 9781414436142.
Gale Encyclopedia of Diets: A Guide to Health and Nutrition. Jacqueline L. Longe, ed. Gale Cengage, 2008. 9781414429915.
New Encyclopedia of Orchids: 1500 Species in Cultivation. Isobyl la Croix. Timber Press, 2008. 9780881928761.
Encyclopedia of Arab-Israeli Conflict: A Political, Social and Military History. Spencer C. Tucker, ed. 4 vols. ABC-CLIO, 2008. 9781851098415.
African American National Biography. Henry Louis Gates Jr. and Evelyn Brooks-Higginbotham, eds. 8 vols. Oxford University Press, 2008. 9780195160192.
Oxford Encyclopedia of Women in World History. Bonnie G. Smith, ed. 4 vols. Oxford University Press, 2008. 9780195148909.

2008 Awards
APA dictionary of psychology. ed. by Gary R. VandenBos. American Psychological Association, 2007. 1591473802.
Encyclopaedia Judaica. ed. by Staff, Macmillan Reference U. S. A. 22 vols. Rev. ed. Gale, 2006. 0028659287.
Blackwell Encyclopedia of Sociology. ed. by George Ritzer. 11 vols. Blackwell, 2007. 1405124334.
Encyclopedia of Body Adornment. by Margo Demello. Greenwood, 2007. 313336954.
Encyclopedia of Race & Racism. ed. by John Hartwell Moore. 4 vols. Gale, 2008. 9780028660202.
Oxford Encyclopedia of Maritime History. ed by John B. Hattendorf. 4 vols. Oxford, 2007. 9780195130751.
Schirmer Encyclopedia of Film. ed. by Barry Keith Grant. 4 vols. Gale, 2006. 0028657912.
Encyclopedia of Asian Theatre. ed. by Samuel L. Leiter. 2 vols. Greenwood, 2007. 03133529x.
Brave New Words: The Oxford Dictionary of Science Fiction. ed. by Jeff Prucher. Oxford, 2007. 0195305671.
Postwar America: An Encyclopedia of Social, Political, Cultural and Economic History. by James Ciment. 4 vols. ME Sharpe, 2007. 079568067x.
Oxford companion to world exploration. ed. by David Buisseret. 2 vols. Oxford, 2007. 019514922X.

2007 Awards
Colonial America: An Encyclopedia of Social, Political, Cultural, and Economic History. ed. James Ciment. M. E. Sharpe, 2005. 0765680653.
Crusades: An Encyclopedia. 4 vols. ed. Alan V. Murray. ABC-Clio, 2006. 1576078620. $385
Encyclopedia of Swearing: Social History of Oaths, Profanity, Foul Language, and Ethnic Slurs in English-Speaking World. Geoffrey Hughes. M. E. Sharpe, 2006. 0765612311.
Encyclopedia of American Revolutionary War: A Political, Social, and Military History. eds. Gregory Fremont-Barnes and Richard Ryerson. ABC-Clio, 2006. 1851094083.
Encyclopedia of Developing World. 3 vols. ed. Thomas M. Leonard. Routledge, 2005. 1579583881.
Encyclopedia of US Labor and Working Class History. 3 vols. ed. Eric Arnesen. Routledge, 2006. 0415968267.
Encyclopedia of Western Colonialism Since 1450. 3 vols. ed. Thomas Benjamin. Macmillan, 2007. 0028658434.
Encyclopedia of Women and Religion in North America. 3 vols. ed. Rosemary Skinner Keller. Indiana, 2006.
Historical Statistics of United States: Earliest Times to Present. 5 vols. eds. Susan B. Carter, Scott Sigmund Gartner, Michael R. Haines, et al. Cambridge, 2006. 0521817919.
Insects: Their Natural History and Diversity. Stephen A. Marshall. Firefly, 2006. 1552979008.
Oxford Encyclopedia of British Literature. 5 vols. ed. David Scott Kastan. Oxford, 2006. 0195169212.
Oxford Encyclopedia of Children's Literature. 4 vols. ed. Jack Zipes. Oxford, 2006. 01951146561.
Qu'ran: An Encyclopedia. ed. Oliver Leaman. Routledge, 2005. 0415326397.
Right, Wrong, and Risky: A Dictionary of Today's American English Usage. Norton, 2005. 0393061191.

References

Citations

Sources 

 RUSA on ALA website
 RUSA Update: News, Events, Awards
 Reference & User Services Assn. (RUSA): Book & Media Award for Outstanding Reference Sources

External links
RUSA Book and Media Awards award site, containing list of recent and earlier awards

American literary awards
Mass media awards